Roshanlal Surirwala was one of the top vyangkar (humorists) of Hindi literature. He was born on 10 January 1931 in Surir, Mathura District. He came from a lower-middle-class family. For his education, he moved to Aligarh, where he completed his master's degree in Hindi literature from Aligarh Muslim University and diploma in library science from Benaras Hindu University. He worked as library head in Aligarh's Shree Varshney Mahavidyalaya until his retirement. He died in 2009 in Aligharh. 

Surirwala's first wife died within one year of his marriage. He remarried again but refused to take dowry, which was a very bold move at that time. His early influence was his maternal uncle, Pyarelal Vrishni, who was a novel writer and editor of a community magazine, Barahseni, published from Aligarh. Surirwala's first article was published in Barahseni when he was only 19 years old. Later on he edited the same magazine thrice in his lifetime. 

Surirwala's works include the humour volumesPatni Sharnam Gachchami, Khaat par hajamat, Bhishti aur Bhasmasur, Langri Bhinn, Shankh aur Murkh, Manch ke Vikramaditya, Murkh Shiromani, Meri Shok Sabha, Ye Mangnewale, and Ghodewala Mehman, the novel Choti Bahu, Kayar, the short-story collection Vaidehi, and the play Badtamiz LogHis last published novel was Patan Ke Pankh.  Gittalen is a collection of very short stories.  Most of his work was published by Prabhat Prakashan or its sister publications.

1931 births
2009 deaths
Indian Muslims
Hindi-language writers
People from Mathura
People from Aligarh